The Mina were a well-organized African-American community of people in Louisiana enslaved from the Bight of Benin and sharing a common language, most likely a dialect of Ewe or Gen.

The Mina
As part of how some Louisiana slave-holders managed enslaved people at the time, the maintenance of African linguistic–ethnic communities was tolerated and even encouraged. The Pointe Coupée Mina community arose following their enslavement and importation into Louisiana following 1782. Among enslaved Africans whose ethnicity was recorded in official documents between 1719 and 1820, Mina were the third-largest enslaved ethnic group in Louisiana.

Many Mina took part in the Pointe Coupée Slave Conspiracy of 1791.

See also
Pointe Coupée Slave Conspiracy of 1795

References

African-American people